I Disagree is the third studio album by American singer Poppy, released on January 10, 2020, via Sumerian Records. It marks her first release on Sumerian Records following her departure from Mad Decent in 2019, as well as her final collaborative project with Titanic Sinclair before the end of their creative partnership in 2019. I Disagree debuted at number 130 on the Billboard 200 for the week of January 25, marking Poppy's first entry on the chart. The album also experienced moderate chart success in Australia and the United Kingdom, debuting atop the Rock & Metal Albums Chart in the latter.

Four songs were released as singles in order to promote the album, all four receiving music videos, with two more album tracks also receiving videos. For further promotion, the singer embarked on the Threesome Tour along with Bring Me the Horizon and Sleeping with Sirens, and the later I Disagree Tour, the Eurasia dates of which were canceled due to the COVID-19 pandemic. A reissue of the album titled I Disagree (More) was released in August 2020, which spawned the fifth and final single "Khaos x4".

Music critics were positive towards I Disagree, praising Poppy for the direction of the album. "Bloodmoney" was nominated for Best Metal Performance at the 63rd Annual Grammy Awards, making Poppy the first female solo artist to ever be nominated in the 30-year history of the category.

Background and release
Poppy began work on I Disagree shortly after the release of Am I a Girl?. In an interview with Gigwise, Poppy called the album "post-genre" and "heavy", as well as stating that the record is a follow-up to the second half of Am I a Girl?, specifically of the songs "Play Destroy" and "X".

"Concrete", the lead single from the album, was released on August 22, 2019. Released alongside its music video, the single came shortly after the announcement of Poppy signing with Sumerian Records and departing with Mad Decent. The album's cover, title and release date were revealed on September 30, 2019 via Poppy's social media accounts. The album art was done by Jesse Draxler. "I Disagree" was released as the second single from the album on October 4, 2019, alongside its music video.

"Bloodmoney" was released as the third single from the album on November 6, 2019, along with the announcement of a 2020 US tour in support of I Disagree and a music video. It was nominated for "Best Metal Performance" at the 63rd Annual Grammy Awards, becoming Poppy's first grammy nomination.  The track list of I Disagree was revealed shortly on November 26, 2019 via Poppy's social media. "Fill the Crown" was released as the fourth single from the album on December 11, 2019, alongside a music video. The music video for "Anything Like Me" directed by Jesse Draxler and Poppy was released on the same day as the album - January 10, 2020. A video for "Sit / Stay" was put out on March 20, 2020.

On an Instagram live stream on April 12, 2020, Sumerian Records announced a deluxe version of the album to be released in summer of 2020. Poppy confirmed on Twitter that the release of the deluxe edition was "right around the corner" on July 22, 2020. The fifth and final single of the album, "Khaos x4", was released on July 28, 2020, the same day Poppy announced the deluxe edition of the album titled I Disagree (More). The reissue, which included the additional tracks "Bleep Bloop", "Don't Ask", and "If It Bleeds" was released on August 14.

Composition

I Disagree has been described as an avant-garde, heavy metal, pop, pop-metal, electropop, industrial rock, rock, nu metal, kawaii metal, hard rock, and industrial record. 

The album incorporated elements of art pop, dubstep, experimental pop, industrial metal, alternative metal, progressive metal, thrash metal, electronic, metalcore, deathcore, post-grunge, progressive rock, pop-punk, dream pop, bubblegum pop, alt-pop, acoustic pop, R&B, J-pop, and K-pop. 

Speaking in an interview with Kerrang!, Poppy said "I've never said my music is metal, but I do listen to that music."

Tour 
I Disagree Tour was the fifth headlining tour by Poppy, in support of her third studio album, I Disagree. There were four warm-up shows in Australia with an altered setlist that began on December 4, 2019 in Melbourne and ended on December 8, 2019 in Brisbane. The main tour began on January 22, 2020 in San Francisco and ended on February 21, 2020 in Los Angeles. An additional European leg was scheduled to begin on March 12 and end on March 30, 2020 but it was eventually cancelled due to the COVID-19 pandemic.

Warm-up dates (Australia)

Show dates (North America)

Cancelled shows (Europe)

Reception

I Disagree received positive reviews from critics. At Metacritic, which assigns a normalized rating out of 100 to reviews from mainstream critics, the album has an average score of 72 out of 100, which indicates "Generally favorable reviews" based on 16 reviews.

Ali Shutler of NME praised I Disagree as "her most accomplished record, full of daring theatre and snarling forward motion". AllMusic writer Neil Z. Yeung also gave the album a positive rating, writing that "As both a symbolic avatar for her life changes and a strong empowerment statement, I Disagree celebrates Poppy's rebirth as a pop-metal alchemist and unabashed rule-breaker." Josh Gray of Clash opined that "Poppy remains a daring and divisive artist making daring and divisive art, and I Disagree is the perfect shot of adrenaline to kick start a new decade with."

Malvika Padin of Gigwise called the album "A true masterpiece in almost every way imaginable..." and "...the perfect album to start 2020 with." While talking positively about the album, Nicoletta Wylde of musicOMH stated, "with I Disagree, Poppy releases her version of Lemonade; both channelling the pain of her recent controversy, sticking two fingers up to the past and translating her performance art into music."

In June 2020, I Disagree was included in Spins 30 best albums of 2020 so far.

Year-end lists

Track listing

Charts

Release history

See also
List of 2020 albums

References

2020 albums
Poppy (entertainer) albums
Sumerian Records albums
Nu metal albums by American artists
Industrial albums by American artists
Hard rock albums by American artists
Heavy metal albums by American artists
Glam metal albums